Henry The Second, King Of England; With The Death Of Rosamond is a 1692 historical play often attributed to William Mountfort but possibly written by John Bancroft. It was first staged at the Theatre Royal, Drury Lane by the United Company. The prologue and epilogue were written by John Dryden. Some incidental music was composed by Henry Purcell.

The play portrays the reign of Henry II of England, and his relationship with his wife Eleanor of Aquitaine and mistress Rosamund Clifford.

The original Drury Lane cast included Thomas Betterton as King Henry the Second, Anthony Leigh as  Vaughan, Samuel Sandford as Abbot, Edward Kynaston as Verulam, John Hodgson as Sussex, Thomas Doggett as Bertrard, Elizabeth Barry as Queen Eleanor, Anne Bracegirdle as  Rosamond and Mary Kent as Rosamond's Woman.

References

Bibliography
 Van Lennep, W. The London Stage, 1660-1800: Volume One, 1660-1700. Southern Illinois University Press, 1960.

1692 plays
West End plays
Tragedy plays
Biographical plays
Plays by William Mountfort
Plays set in the 12th century
Plays set in England
Plays about English royalty